Sepik may refer to places in Papua New Guinea:

Sepik River
East Sepik - a province
Sandaun - a province formerly known as West Sepik
Sepik region - consisting of East Sepik and Sandaun provinces

In languages it may refer to:

Sepik languages - a proposed language family

And to:

Sepik – a traditional Estonian whole wheat bread.